Andri Lucas Guðjohnsen (born 29 January 2002) is an Icelandic professional footballer who plays as a centre forward for Swedish club IFK Norrköping and the Iceland national team.

Biography 
Born in London, Andri is the son of the former Bolton Wanderers, Chelsea and Barcelona footballer Eiður Guðjohnsen, the grandson of former Anderlecht star Arnór Guðjohnsen, and the younger brother of IF Elfsborg footballer Sveinn Aron Guðjohnsen. He has a younger brother Daniel.

Club career 
Andri Guðjohnsen started playing football in FC Barcelona, but after three years in La Masia, he left to play for his local club, Gavà, before joining Barcelona's rivals Espanyol in 2015.

He moved to Real Madrid, another rival of Barcelona, from Espanyol in the summer of 2018. He had scored 20 goals for Espanyol youth teams the previous season, and Real was reported to have made the youngster's signing a top priority, also including Andri's younger brother Dani in the deal.

His first season in Madrid was successful, as his performances earned him a place in the U19 squad at only 16 years old, where he scored several goals, under Raúl's management. He also finished the season as the top scorer for Real Madrid Juvenil C (Under-17).

In July 2020, Andri tore an anterior cruciate ligament in his knee and was expected to miss six months.

In July 2021, Andri was promoted to the Castilla side, and in September 2021, he was included in Real Madrid’s Champions League squad for the first time.

In the summer of 2022, Andri found himself out of favour in the Castilla side. That led to Andri and Real Madrid coming to an agreement that he would leave "Los Blancos".

On 22 July 2022 Andri was officially announced as a IFK Norrköping player.

International career 
Andri Guðjohnsen has played with several Icelandic youth groups. One of his youth international career highs was when he scored a hat trick against Germany, qualifying his team for Euro U17 2019. Andri was also eligible to represent England (where he was born) and Spain (where he was raised).

On 25 January 2021, Andri was called up to the Icelandic senior national team for the first time. He made his debut on 2 September 2021 in a World Cup qualifier against Romania, a 0–2 home loss. He substituted Albert Guðmundsson in the 79th minute. He scored his first goal on 5 September 2021 against North Macedonia, 2 minutes after being substituted on in the 82nd minute.

Career statistics

International
International goals
Scores and results list Iceland's goal tally first.

References

External links

2002 births
Living people
Andri Gudjohnsen
Andri Gudjohnsen
Andri Gudjohnsen
Association football forwards
Footballers from Greater London
RCD Espanyol footballers
FC Barcelona players
Real Madrid Castilla footballers
CF Gavà players
Andri Gudjohnsen
Andri Gudjohnsen
Andri Gudjohnsen
Expatriate footballers in Spain
Primera Federación players